is the third single by the Japanese girl idol group Team Syachihoko, released in Japan on October 31, 2012 by Unborde Records (Warner Music Japan).

Promotion 
"The Stardust Bowling" was Team Syachihoko's first major-label single. It was called the band's "Nagoya major debut single" and was accompanied by a concert tour in Nagoya City.

Chart performance 
The single topped at 17th position in the Oricon Weekly Singles Chart.

Track listing

Nagoya Major Debut Edition

Nagoya and Venue Limited Edition

Charts

References

External links 
 Releases - "The Stardust Bowling" - Team Syachihoko official site 
 Team Syachihoko - Unborde Records 
 "The Stardust Bowling" - Review - Rolling Stone Japan Edition 

Team Syachihoko songs
2012 singles
Japanese-language songs
2012 songs
Unborde singles